The Amsterdam Tournament 2008, known as the "LG Amsterdam Tournament 2008" for sponsorship reasons, was the tenth Amsterdam Tournament, a pre-season football tournament for club teams from around the world. The 2008 tournament was contested by Ajax, Arsenal, Internazionale and Sevilla on 8 August and 9 August 2008 at the Amsterdam ArenA. For the third time in four years, Arsenal won the tournament with 8 points.

Table

NB: An extra point is awarded for each goal scored.

Matches

Day 1

Day 2

References

2008 
2008–09 in Dutch football
2008–09 in Spanish football
2008–09 in Italian football
2008–09 in English football

it:Torneo di Amsterdam#2008